Bombyx horsfieldi is a moth in the family Bombycidae. It was described by Frederic Moore in 1860. It is found in Taiwan.

References

Bombycidae
Moths described in 1860